Private Charles Bieger (March 25, 1844 – August 10, 1930) was a German soldier who fought in the American Civil War. Bieger received the United States' highest award for bravery during combat, the Medal of Honor, for his action at Ivy Farm, in Mississippi on 22 February 1864. He was honored with the award on 8 July 1897.

Biography
Bieger was born in Wiesbaden, Germany and enlisted into Company D, 4th Missouri Volunteer Cavalry at St. Louis, Missouri after immigrating to St. Louis with his family in 1857. In February 1864 he was part of a military effort from Memphis into Mississippi, intending to meet William T. Sherman crew at Meridian, Mississippi. Bieger's cavalry came under fire near Okolona, Mississippi. It was during this exchange that Bieger's captain, Frederick Hunsen was thrown from his horse and surrounded by gunfire from the enemy. Bieger pressed through the gunfire, rescuing his captain. It is for this act of bravery that he was awarded the Medal of Honor.

After the war Bieger lived with his family in St. Louis. He became a salesman and died on 10 August 1930. His remains are interred at the Mount Hope Cemetery Mausoleum and Crematory in St. Louis, Missouri. Previously in a conspicuous grave, the lot in which Bieger, his wife and three of his children are buried was updated in 2005 with an engraved floatstone, commemorating his Medal of Honor award. This effort was spearheaded by Don Morfe of the Medal of Honor Historical Society.

Medal of Honor citation

See also

List of American Civil War Medal of Honor recipients: A–F

References

1844 births
1930 deaths
Foreign-born Medal of Honor recipients
German-born Medal of Honor recipients
Hessian emigrants to the United States
People from the Duchy of Nassau
People of Missouri in the American Civil War
Union Army soldiers
United States Army Medal of Honor recipients
American Civil War recipients of the Medal of Honor